Toury-Lurcy is a commune in the Nièvre department in central France.

History
From the 12th century, the village of Toury-Lurcy (formerly Thoriacum or Toriaco) was one of the fiefdoms of the Counts of Thoury (hence its name).

In 1161, the bishop of Nevers, Bernard of Saint-Saulge, recognized by letters sent to the abbot of St. Martin, Autun, that this church in his diocese was the property of the abbey, which was confirmed in 1164 by a bull of Pope Alexander III, then a refugee in France. The family of Richard de Soultrait were the local lords.

The town was created in 1823 from the merger of Toury and Lurcy-sur-Abron.

The Château de Toury-Lurcy, rebuilt in 1776 on a medieval site, is classified and registered as a historical monument.

Notable people 
Georges de Soultrait, count, regional historian, born and died at Toury (1822-1888).
Jean Saulnier, knight, lord of Thoury-sur-Abron, councilor and chamberlain of the king, steward of Isabeau, duchess of Bourbonnais, and bailiff of Saint-Pierre-le-Moûtier, died in 1389.
Agnes de Tressolles, wife of Jean Saulnier.
Florimond-Augustin Daubois, parish priest of Toury from 1710 to 1742, left many precious annotations on the margins of his actions in the parish registers.

Population

On 1 January 2019, the estimated population was 416.

See also
Communes of the Nièvre department

References

Communes of Nièvre